Blossoms are an English pop band from Stockport, Greater Manchester, England. Formed in 2013, the band consists of Tom Ogden (lead vocals, guitar), Charlie Salt (bass, backing vocals), Josh Dewhurst (lead guitar, percussion), Joe Donovan (drums) and Myles Kellock (keyboards, synthesizer, backing vocals).

They were on the BBC's Sound Of new music list for 2016 where they finished in fourth place. They were one of only two guitar bands on the list, alongside Rat Boy. Blossoms' self-titled debut album was one of the twelve albums nominated for the Mercury Music Prize in 2017. That same year, they were nominated for British Breakthrough Act at the Brit Awards.

Career

Pre-Blossoms and formation

Unknowingly at the time, all members of the band were born in Stepping Hill Hospital in Stockport, and lived within two miles of each other whilst growing up. Tom Ogden and Joe Donovan met through a school trip to Alton Towers, which both of them were placed on due to good attendance, in 2005. During their time in high school they became 'into bands' from the local Manchester music scene such as Oasis and The Stone Roses and saw both aforementioned bands together. Donovan previously knew bassist Charlie Salt as all members of Blossoms went to the same secondary school, though not at the same time. Ogden began writing songs aged 15 despite not being in a band, encouraged by his father. Salt was previously a member of Mutineers with former Haven rhythm section Iwan Gronow and Jack Mitchell.

After high school Donovan and later Ogden went on to have jobs at the Alma Lodge Hotel as event staff, they were later joined by Kellock who got a job by Ogden's good word after he joined the unnamed band that would come to be Blossoms. Kellock previously worked at a Co-Op. The Alma Lodge Hotel also served as the venue to the first bands that all five members were in, Salt and guitarist Josh Dewhurst featuring in other bands. After all featuring on the same bill Salt and Dewhurst gravitated toward the other members of Blossoms, together eventually becoming members of the band in January 2013. Ogden, Donovan and Kellock often spent time on their shifts discussing the band and playing demos which got them into trouble several times. On 3 April 2013, Blossoms played their first gig in the Night and Day Cafe on Oldham Street, Manchester for £3 entry.

Early work

Upon Salt joining the band, they gained a rehearsal space, his grandfather's scaffolding yard which proved ideal as they were able to use it without paying for the time. The scaffolding yard is the location featured on the cover of their debut album. The band take their name from The Blossoms public house at the corner of Bramhall Lane and Buxton Road in Stockport. Donovan heard both Ogden and Salt mention how apt Blossoms was as a band name on separate occasions, leading to the naming of the band as Blossoms. They have since played shows at The Blossoms.

In January 2014, the band released their first single, "You Pulled a Gun on Me", and on 14 January 2014 they released a video for the song. The video was self-produced with a small budget of £60. "You Pulled a Gun on Me" was recorded at Eve Studios in Stockport. In Spring 2014, Blossoms were signed to Skeleton Key Records (owned by James Skelly of The Coral). From March through to August 2014, Blossoms embarked upon their first UK tour to promote the Bloom EP though they only played weekend shows due to all members of the band still holding full-time jobs, other than Dewhurst who was only 16 and still in full-time education. They got their first write up on the Louder Than War music website, played their first festival (Tramlines in Sheffield at Yellow Arch Studios) and opened for James at Castlefield Bowl to 8,000 people, on 11 July 2014, which they described as a turning point in the band's future. Skelly produced their first official single "Blow", released 26 August 2014, the video being shot at the scaffolding yard that was still being used as a rehearsal space.

In autumn 2014, Blossoms quit their jobs to fully pursue the band and subsequently went on to do another full UK tour, this time selling out the Manchester date, hosted by Sound Control, a venue made famous by The Stone Roses and New Order. They also sold out a show at the Deaf Institute, Manchester on 1 November 2014. Over the winter, Blossoms went back into Parr Street Studios with James Skelly to record "Cut Me and I'll Bleed", for which they announced an extensive UK tour between 31 January and 28 March 2015.

Due to them having a contact in the business, the singer Liam Fray, this promoted them to tour with The Charlatans and The Courteeners in March 2015. On 18 March 2015, Blossoms were invited by BBC Introducing to play a set for the Official SXSW Showcase at Latitude 30 in Austin, Texas. Blossoms recorded and released the Blown Rose EP between June and July, the video once again shot at the scaffolding yard, released on 31 July along with the EP itself. This was the first EP released as part of Blossoms' new record deal with Virgin EMI though they only announced the new contract on 18 August 2015. The band still work with James Skelly as their producer.

They went on to play a summer of festivals such as The Great Escape, Y Not and Reading and Leeds whilst also supporting the Courteeners for their Heaton Park show. Blossoms headlined their first festival stage on 5 September 2015 at Tim Peak's Diner as part of Festival No. 6.

This was released as a 10" vinyl disc for Record Store Day 2017.

Blossoms
Recording for the debut album began in September 2015. On 4 October 2015, Blossoms announced that their next single would be "Charlemagne" and released the song on iTunes and Spotify on 5 October 2015. On 30 October 2015, the Charlemagne EP was released featuring three other songs ("Across the Moor", "For Evelyn" and "Polka Dot Bones"). "Charlemagne" went on to commercial success and became BBC Radio 1's track of the day and featured on Spotify's 'Spotlight on 2016' list. The commercial success extended through to December where Charlemagne topped the Christmas vinyl chart.

On 5 January 2016, Blossoms announced their At Most a Kiss EP and released the song, with the video following. Whilst doing promotion for the EP Blossoms played the Radio 1 Live Lounge, covering WSTRN's "In2". They announced on 22 January 2016 that recording for their debut album was complete. Whilst on their third headline tour Blossoms had support from Viola Beach, who were killed mid-tour in a car crash with their manager on 13 February 2016. Blossoms played a recorded set from a Royal Leamington Spa performance for the remaining tour dates in the slot that Viola Beach would have otherwise played in.

The At Most a Kiss EP was released on 23 February 2016. They were nominated for Best Breakthrough Act at the 37th Brit Awards but lost to Rag'n'Bone Man. On 12 April 2016, Annie Mac played their song "Getaway" for the first time on BBC Radio 1 before a midnight release of the single on iTunes and Spotify. In May it was announced that Blossoms would play their biggest show to date and support the Stone Roses at Etihad Stadium on 15 June 2016, after Ian Brown became a fan of the band. Once again Blossoms are playing a summer of festivals, being clocked up to 41 festivals by Dewhurst. Blossoms' eponymous debut album was released on 5 August with "My Favourite Room" and "Honey Sweet" being released to pre-orders early as singles. It was met with mostly favourable reviews and peaked at the top of the UK Albums Chart in its first week, giving Blossoms their first number-one album. Blossoms featured on the August cover of NME magazine. An autumn tour to support the album release also sold out including a performance at Stockport's Plaza Theatre at midnight on the day of the album's release.

On 9 September 2017, Blossoms performed at Manchester Arena as part of We Are Manchester to mark the reopening of the venue following a terrorist attack there three months prior.

Cool Like You
Cool Like You was their second studio album. It was released in the United Kingdom on 27 April 2018, by Virgin EMI Records. The album was produced by James Skelly and Rich Turvey. It peaked at number 4 on the UK Albums Chart, and at number 1 on the Official Vinyl Albums Chart. Subsequently after this, the band followed up the album's release with a UK tour which was completely sold out, including a night at the O2 Apollo in Manchester and three shows at Stockport Plaza. After playing some festivals in the summer, Blossoms announced another UK tour for December, including two nights at Manchester's O2 Victoria Warehouse and the O2 Brixton Academy in London. The entire tour sold out within minutes on the day tickets went on sale.

In June 2019 Blossoms played a homecoming show at Edgeley Park Stadium, selling out every ticket in under an hour.

Foolish Loving Spaces
The band released their third album, Foolish Loving Spaces, on 31 January 2020. The album was preceded by the singles "Your Girlfriend", "The Keeper" and "If You Think This Is Real Life". The album went to number 1 on the UK album charts. In November 2020, they premiered a 90-minute long documentary entitled "Blossoms: Back to Stockport" on YouTube and Amazon Prime.

In April 2021 they made national headlines when they were announced as headlining a one-day "trial" festival at Sefton Park on 2 May that year. The festival was notable as the first major festival in the UK for 14 months with no social distancing or face masks, following the worldwide COVID-19 pandemic. In September 2021, they teamed up with Rick Astley, performing covers of The Smiths songs. The band announced further performances with Astley on 8 and 9 October 2021.

Ribbon Around The Bomb
The band released their fourth album, Ribbon Around The Bomb, on 29 April 2022. The album was once again peaked at number 1 on the UK album charts, making it their third attempt to do so.

Members
 Tom Ogden – lead vocals, rhythm guitar, piano
 Charlie Salt – bass, guitar, backing vocals
 Josh Dewhurst – lead guitar, percussion
 Joe Donovan – drums
 Myles Kellock – keyboards, synthesizer, piano, backing vocals

Touring
 Ryan Ellis – guitar
 Collette Williams – percussion, backing vocals
 Dan Woolfie – guitar, percussion, backing vocals
 John Simm – drums, percussion

Discography

 Blossoms (2016)
 Cool Like You (2018)
 Foolish Loving Spaces (2020)
 Ribbon Around the Bomb (2022)

References

External links
 

2013 establishments in the United Kingdom
British indie pop groups
English indie rock groups
Music in the Metropolitan Borough of Stockport
Musical groups from Greater Manchester
Musical groups established in 2013
Musical quintets